Herbert Ilsanker (born May 24, 1967 in Hallein, Austria) is a retired  professional football goalkeeper.

Career
He started his career with his local club SK Hallein. Afterwards he was transferred to SV Austria Salzburg where he spent most of his active career (1993 -1998). For Salzburg he played 98 matches. From 1998 till the end of his career 2001 he played with the German side 1. FSV Mainz 05 where he was teammate of Jürgen Klopp, now coach of Liverpool.

Since 2005 he is goalkeeper coach of FC Red Bull Salzburg.

Honours
as player (with SV Austria Salzburg)
Austrian Champion: 1995, 1997
Austrian Supercup: 1995, 1997
as coach (with FC Red Bull Salzburg)
Austrian Champion: 2007, 2008, 2010, 2012 
Austrian Cup: 2012

Trivia
Herbert Ilsanker is the father of Stefan Ilsanker, who is playing for FC Red Bull Leibzig.

References

1967 births
Living people
People from Hallein
Association football goalkeepers
Austrian footballers
Austrian Football Bundesliga players
FC Red Bull Salzburg managers
1. FSV Mainz 05 players
Austrian football managers
Footballers from Salzburg (state)
FC Red Bull Salzburg non-playing staff